Malathi is a Sri Lankan Tamil Tiger rebel and the first women fighter to killed in combat.

Malathi or Malati or Malathy may also refer to

 Malati, protagonist heroine of the ancient Indian drama Mālatīmādhava by Bhavabhuti
 Malathi Krishnamurthy Holla, Indian para athlete
 Malathi de Alwis, Sri Lankan anthropologist and activist
 Malathi Rao, Indian writer
 Malathi Chendur, Indian writer
 Malathi Basappa, Indian model
 Malathy Lakshman, Indian singer
 Malathion, organophosphate parasympathomimetic 
 Malathini, South African mbaqanga singer
 Malathi, a 1970 Indian film
 Malati Dasi, a senior spiritual leader of the International Society for Krishna Consciousness 
 Master Malati, a Coptic Orthodox martyr and saint
 Malati Choudhury, an Indian civil rights and freedom activist
 Malati Ghoshal, an Indian Rabindra Sangeet singer

Indian feminine given names
Tamil feminine given names